Rev. Fr. Romuald D'Souza, SJ (20 December 1925 – 1 November 2019) was an Indian Jesuit priest.

D'Souza was born in Aldona, Goa. He was ordained as a priest in 1958 in Belgium. He did his master's degree in counselling from Fordham University, New York City United States. After that he studied further at Columbia University, New York City.

He returned to India in 1962 and took over as principal of St. Vincent's High School Pune in 1967. He founded the Xavier Centre of Historical Research, Porvorim, Goa in 1978. He served as the Director of XLRI, Jamshedpur from 1982 to 1989. In 1987, he founded the Xavier Institute of Management, Bhubaneswar and was its Director till 1993. In 1993, he founded the Goa Institute of Management at Panaji Goa and served as its director till 2004.

He served as a Member of various academic organisations, like the Association of Management Development Institutes of South Asia, the All India Board of Management Studies, Government of India, the Executive Council of the Goa University, the Academic Council of Utkal University. He was a professional member of the Academy of Management United States, International Council of Psychologists and the American Psychological Society. He taught business ethics, management of stress, psychometrics and organisational behaviour. He also founded the now defunct Marian Institute of Healthcare Management, Goa.

On 26 January 2010, the Government of India, awarded Romuald D'Souza the Padma Shri, India's fourth highest civilian award, for his contribution to Education and Literature.

References

External links
 Meet the tireless, ageless institution builder | Goa News - Times of India

1925 births
2019 deaths
Business educators
20th-century Indian Jesuits
People from Goa
Recipients of the Padma Shri in literature & education
Indian expatriates in Belgium